Resiklo is a 2007 Philippine post-apocalyptic sci-fi film written and directed by Mark A. Reyes and starring Ramon "Bong" Revilla Jr., Dingdong Dantes, and Jennylyn Mercado. It is the entry of Revilla's outfit, Imus Productions, to the 2007 Metro Manila Film Festival.

Premise
Set in December 2021, Resiklo is the story of Crisval Sarmiento, an ex-military Colonel who leads a rag-tag group of survivors in the Philippines against the insect-like alien invaders known as the Balangs (locusts). "Because of the enormous expenditures in resources during the invasion (hinted in the movie's opening credits), the humans are forced to scavenge the destroyed landscape for anything that could be recycled and put to use at their secret sanctuary, called Paraiso (Paradise).

They are in a race against time, as in addition to the resource gathering, the survivors are fighting to eliminate the Balangs and their human collaborators, the Mutanos (mutated humans), while keeping Paraiso's location secret and along the way, uncovering the truth behind the invasion as well.

Cast
Bong Revilla as Colonel Crisval Sarmiento
Jennylyn Mercado as Bianca
Dingdong Dantes as Angelo
Jolo Revilla as Ice
Paolo Contis as Dens
Michelle Madrigal as Dr. Miles
Empress Schuck as Gila
Ella Cruz as Kiara
Jairus Aquino as Arkin
Bobby Andrews as Dos
Mylene Dizon as Alura
Roi Vinzon as Hades
Benjie Paras as Deecon
TJ Trinidad as Jerson

Production
The majority of the visual effects were handled by Riot, Ignite Media, and Digital Dodge, with Erick Torrente supervising the special effects.

International releases
In Japan, Resiklo was retitled Transbattler (トランスバトラー), with a film poster emphasizing the presence of giant robots in the story and playing on the popularity of the Transformers franchise.

Critical reception
The CBCP's CINEMA (Catholic Initiative for Enlightened Movie Appreciation) gave the film a score of three out of five stars, stating it as a straight and simple sci-fi movie with an "ensemble cast that acts out the story."

The mecha action scenes were dismissed as copycats of the battle scenes from Transformers. Director Mark Reyes insisted that such was not the case, stating that the concept for the movie was made before the Hollywood film was in development.

Accolades

References

External links
 Resiklo Movie Website
 Resiklo Flickr Photos
 Imus Productions 
 

2007 films
2000s fantasy action films
2007 science fiction action films
Alien invasions in films
Dingdong Dantes films
Films set in 2021
Philippine science fantasy films
Philippine science fiction action films
Philippine post-apocalyptic films
Films directed by Mark A. Reyes